The 1974 Hardy Cup was the 1974 edition of the Canadian intermediate senior ice hockey championship.

Final
Best of 5
Warroad 7 Embrun 3
Warroad 4 Embrun 3
Warroad 9 Embrun 1
Warroad Lakers beat Embrun Panthers 3-0 on series.

Eastern Playdowns

Teams
Northern Ontario: Lively Cyclones
OHA: Georgetown Raiders
Ottawa District: Embrun Panthers
New Brunswick: Moncton Bears
Newfoundland: Labrador City Carol Lakers

Playdowns

Western Playdowns

Teams
British Columbia: Coquitlam Canadians
Alberta: Calgary Trojans
Saskatchewan: Rosetown Red Wings
Manitoba: Warroad Lakers

Playdowns

External links

Hockey Canada

Hardy Cup
Hardy